Stark and Fulton  was an engineering company in Glasgow, Scotland. Little is known about the company except that it built some of the first steam locomotives for the Glasgow, Paisley, Kilmarnock and Ayr Railway and the Midland Counties Railway around 1840. For about four months, D B Stark was a loco superintendent of the former line.

Locomotives
Those for the GPK&AR were Stuart and Bute. They were probably similar to those for the MCR and of the 2-2-0 "Bury" type. The MCR locos were  Hawk, Vulture and Eagle,   with 5'6" driving wheels 5'6" and cylinders 12"x18". These were supplied in 1839 and four more were supplied to the GPK&R in 1840:  Mercury (No 1), Mazeppa (No 2), Wallace and Queen. In 1849, they supplied one of 2-2-2 formation for use on the Caledonian and Dumbartonshire Junction Railway, which later became part of the Edinburgh and Glasgow Railway.

References
 Lowe, J.W., (1989) British Steam Locomotive Builders, Guild Publishing

Locomotive manufacturers of the United Kingdom
Engineering companies of Scotland
Manufacturing companies based in Glasgow
1830s establishments in Scotland